Kruszyny  is a village in the administrative district of Gmina Pyzdry, within Września County, Greater Poland Voivodeship, in west-central Poland.

The village has a population of 12.

References

Kruszyny